Mallucci is an Italian surname. Notable people with the surname include:

 Giovanna Mallucci (born 1963), professor in the Department of Clinical Neurosciences at the University of Cambridge
 Vittorugo Mallucci, Italian racing driver

Italian-language surnames